Chester Stanley Jaworski (November 8, 1916 – October 16, 2003) was the University of Rhode Island (URI)'s first All-American selection in men's basketball. As a senior in 1938–39, he led the nation in scoring at 22.9 points per game and was named the Helms Foundation College Basketball Player of the Year as well as a Consensus NCAA First Team All-American. He scored a career-high 44 points in December 1938. Jaworski played the forward position in basketball, but he also earned three varsity letters for the school's baseball team and one letter for the football team. For his achievements, Jaworski was enshrined into both the URI and New England Basketball Halls of Fame. He was a member of the Bristol Tramps champions of the 1946-47 Eastern Basketball League - Connecticut

References

1916 births
2003 deaths
All-American college men's basketball players
American men's basketball players
American people of Polish descent
Basketball players from Worcester, Massachusetts
Players of American football from Worcester, Massachusetts
Forwards (basketball)
Rhode Island Rams baseball players
Rhode Island Rams football players
Rhode Island Rams men's basketball players